Mnarolitia is a genus of moths of the family Xyloryctidae.

Species
 Mnarolitia ambreella Viette, 1967
 Mnarolitia griveaudi Viette, 1967
 Mnarolitia nectaropa (Meyrick, 1914)
 Mnarolitia paulianellum Viette, 1954
 Mnarolitia similans Viette, 1967
 Mnarolitia sylvestrella Viette, 1968

References

 
Xyloryctidae
Xyloryctidae genera